The Aberdonia was an English car manufactured in Park Royal, London from 1911 to 1915 by the coachbuilders Brown, Hughes and Strachan. The engine was a 3160 cc, 4 cylinder, side valve unit rated at 20 hp for taxation purposes. It cost £500 with seven-seated touring coachwork, or £700 with "special landau body". 

At the 1911 London Motor Show a one-off design, mid-engined and forward-control with the driver ahead of the engine was displayed.

See also
 List of car manufacturers of the United Kingdom

Defunct motor vehicle manufacturers of England
Motor vehicle manufacturers based in London
1911 establishments in England
1915 disestablishments in England
Vehicle manufacturing companies established in 1911
Vehicle manufacturing companies disestablished in 1915
British companies disestablished in 1915
British companies established in 1911